Alpha Secondary is a public high school in Burnaby, British Columbia part of School District 41 Burnaby.

Academics 
Alpha Secondary offers a broad range of educational programming, including French Immersion, Mini School, Advanced Placement, and Honours courses, as well as Ace-It programs. Students wishing to earn their professional certification as a hairstylist can enroll in the two year District Hairdressing Program which is located at Alpha.  The Fitness Leadership Program is also at Alpha, which provides students with Douglas College credits, and Canadian Fitness Education Services (CFES) weight training instructor and Personal Trainer national certification.  Alpha also has an integrated honours program for Grade 8 students called Discovery. In 2008, Alpha students earned over $410,000 in Scholarships.

Clubs and councils
Students at Alpha are provided with a variety of leadership opportunities through their participation in over 30 clubs and councils.  The main leadership groups are: Student Government, Music Council, Visual Arts Council, Grad Council, and The Offence.  Other groups go beyond the school and organize events that improve both the local and global community. Alpha also has a debate team. Through these groups, students organize school based events that contribute to the school culture.

Athletics 

 2002 Provincial AAA Boys Soccer – Placed 2nd
 2003 Provincial AAA Boys Soccer Champions
 2005 Provincial AAA Volleyball – Placed 3rd
 2006 Provincial AAA Volleyball Champions
 2007 Provincial AAA Volleyball – Placed 2nd
 2013 Provincial AAA Rugby – Placed 2nd
 2013 BNWSSAA Junior Girls Soccer Champions
 2015 BNWSSAA Senior Boys Soccer Champions
 2017 BNWSSAA Junior Boys Soccer Champions
 2017 VNDS Junior Boys Soccer Champions
 2017/18 Provincial Gymnastics Champion
 2018/19 BNWSSAA Junior Boys Soccer Champions
 2018/19 VNDS Junior Boys Soccer Champion

Notable alumni/current students 
Mike James, retired professional rugby player, former Team Canada captain.
Ashley Leitão, former top ten contestant on Canadian Idol, attended Alpha and graduated in 2004.
Devon Sawa, actor (Final Destination, Casper) (Class of 1998)
Don Taylor, grad of 1977 currently working for Sportsnet, and the TEAM 1040
Alfredo Valente, an Olympic soccer player and soccer player for the Vancouver Whitecaps FC, graduated from Alpha in 1998.
Loreto Siniscalchi, Team Canada Junior National Team Baseball, Little League World Series.
Theo Millas, Team Canada Junior National Team Baseball.

References

External links
School website

School Reports - Ministry of Education
 Class Size
 2005/2006 Satisfaction Survey
 School Performance
 Skills Assessment

High schools in Burnaby
Educational institutions established in 1950
1950 establishments in British Columbia